The lesser red musk shrew (Crocidura hirta) is a species of mammal in the family Soricidae. It is found in Angola, Botswana, Democratic Republic of the Congo, Malawi, Mozambique, Namibia, South Africa, Eswatini, Tanzania, Zambia, and Zimbabwe. Its natural habitat are savanna, subtropical or tropical dry lowland grassland, and hot deserts.

References
 Baxter, R. 2004.  Crocidura hirta.   2006 IUCN Red List of Threatened Species.   Downloaded on 30 July 2007.

Crocidura
Mammals described in 1852
Taxa named by Wilhelm Peters
Taxonomy articles created by Polbot